An Enemy of the People (original Norwegian title: En folkefiende), an 1882 play by Norwegian playwright Henrik Ibsen, followed his previous play, Ghosts, which criticized the hypocrisy of his society's moral code. That response included accusations of both Ghosts and its author being  "scandalous," "degenerate," and "immoral." In An Enemy of the People, a man dares to expose an unpalatable truth publicly and is punished for it. 

However, Ibsen took a somewhat skeptical view of his protagonist, suggesting that he may have gone too far in his zeal to tell the truth. Ibsen wrote to his publisher: "I am still uncertain as to whether I should call [An Enemy of the People] a comedy or a straight drama. It may [have] many traits of comedy, but it also is based on a serious idea."

Plot overview

Act I
Dr. Thomas Stockmann is the medical officer of a recently opened spa in a small town. The play begins with a dinner party hosted by Dr. Stockmann and his wife, Katrine. The dinner guests include Dr. Stockmann's brother Peter (the mayor) and Hovstad (the editor of the newspaper). Peter asks Stockmann about a rumor that Hovstad is about to print an article the doctor wrote regarding the spa baths. Dr. Stockmann is evasive about the nature of this article, and Peter leaves. Petra, Dr. Stockmann's daughter, brings in a letter containing lab test results confirming Dr. Stockmann's suspicions that the spa water is contaminated with bacteria, and Hovstad agrees to print Dr. Stockmann's article, although revealing the truth may force the baths to shut down, with negative repercussions for the town's economy. Dr. Stockmann has mixed reactions to these events but ultimately rejoices about preventing harm through the contaminated water.

Act II
The next morning Morten Kiil, Dr. Stockmann's father-in-law, stops by to congratulate him on what Kiil believes is an elaborate prank, since Kiil thinks the notion that the baths are tainted is too ridiculous to be believed, especially not by the mayor. Hovstad and the printer Aslaksen visit to reinforce their commitment to the doctor and extend their gratitude; the newspaper wants to confront the government of the town and expose its corruption, and this opportunity is a good start.

Peter arrives and tells Dr. Stockmann that if he selfishly proceeds to publish this article, he will be partially culpable for the town's ruin. Peter urges Dr. Stockmann to think of the bigger picture, retract the article, and solve the problem in a quieter way. Dr. Stockmann refuses; Peter warns of terrible consequences for him and his family.

Act III
In the newspaper office, Hovstad and Billing discuss the pros and cons of running Dr. Stockmann's article. Dr. Stockmann arrives and tells them to print the article, but they begin questioning how valuable it is to expose the government in this way, concluding that printing this article will do more harm than good, because of its likely effect on the town's economy. Peter Stockmann appears with a statement of his own, intended to reassure the public about the safety of the spa baths, and the newspaper agrees to print it. Desperate, Dr. Stockmann decides that he does not need the paper to print anything and that he can fight this battle on his own. He decides to call a town meeting and spread the information that way. Although Katrine Stockmann realizes that her husband is risking his reputation, she stands by him.

Act IV
At a town meeting in Captain Horster's house, Dr. Stockmann is about to read his water report to the townspeople. Billing, the family, the mayor, Aslaksen, and Hovstad are there. Aslaksen, a respected citizen, is elected Chairman of the meeting. Permission for Dr. Stockmann's being allowed to speak is about to be voted on, when Dr. Stockmann says he has a different subject. He then winds up into a passionate oration about social evolution. He says that new, truthful ideas are always condemned, due to the "colossal stupidity of the authorities" and the small-mindedness of "the compact liberal majority" of the people, who may as well "be exterminated." The audience feels insulted by these accusations and anger rises. By the end of the meeting the audience has rebelled, repeatedly shouting, "He is an enemy of the people!"  Dr. Stockmann tells his father-in-law, Kiil, that it is his tannery that is leaking most of the poisons into the baths. As the crowd is leaving, voices are heard threatening to break Stockmann's windows.

Act V
By the next morning, Dr. Stockmann's house, especially his study, has been badly damaged, for the town has turned against him and his family. The landlord is evicting them from their house;  Petra has been fired from her job as a schoolteacher for having progressive opinions; Peter comes to the house with a letter from the board of directors of the baths that terminates his contract along with a resolution from the homeowners' association stating that no one should hire Dr. Stockmann in this town again.

Dr. Stockmann's father-in-law, Morton Kiil, arrives to say that he has just bought shares in the Baths with the money that he had intended to leave to his daughter and grandchildren. He expects that will cause his son-in-law to stop his crusade, to ensure that the spa does not go bankrupt and his family will have a secure future. Dr. Stockmann rebuffs Kiil's threat and also ignores Peter's advice to leave town for a few months. Katrine tells Dr. Stockmann she is afraid that the people will drive him out of town. But Dr. Stockmann replies that he intends to stay and make them understand "that considerations of expediency turn morality and justice upside down." He ends by proclaiming himself the strongest man in town because he is able to stand alone.

Characters

 Doctor Thomas Stockmann, the medical officer at the new Municipal Baths and the protagonist.
 Mrs. Katherine Stockmann, his wife.
 Petra, their daughter, a teacher.
 Ejlif & Morten, their sons.
 Peter Stockmann, Doctor Stockmann's elder brother; he is the mayor of the town and thus Thomas' supervisor.
 Morten Kiil, a tanner (Mrs. Stockmann's  father), also known as the Badger.
 Hovstad, editor of The Peoples' Messenger, the local paper.
 Billing, sub-editor.
 Captain Horster, a shipmaster going to America and a friend of Thomas Stockmann.
 Aslaksen, a publisher (also a character in The League of Youth).
 Men of various conditions and occupations, a few women, and a troop of schoolboys – the audience at a public meeting.

Themes
In An Enemy of the People, speaking the language of comic exaggeration through the mouth of his spokesman, the idealist Doctor Thomas Stockmann, Ibsen puts into very literal terms the theme of the play: It is true that ideas grow stale and platitudinous, but one may go one step further and say flatly that truths die. According to Stockmann, there are no absolute principles of either wisdom or morality.  In this Ibsen is referring indirectly to the reception of his previous plays.  For example, the commandment "honor thy father and thy mother" referred to in Ghosts is not simply either true or false.  It may have been a truth once and a falsehood today.  As Stockmann states in his excited harangue to his political enemies: 
 
Yet, Ibsen addresses in an engaging manner a number of challenges that remain highly relevant today, such as environmental issues (versus economic interests), professional responsibilities (of experts in policy debates) and, last but not least, the moral dilemmas and tensions involved in whistle blowing.

Background

As in any other plays, Ibsen derived names and traits from his relatives, including the name Stockmann, a real family in Telemark from which lbsen himself was descended; Ibsen was also born in Stockmanngarden in Skien. Peter Stockmann, who in the Norwegian original holds the offices of byfoged (city judge/magistrate) and politimester (chief of police), was based on lbsen's uncle, Christian Corneliys Paus, who held the same two offices in Skien and who was also a descendant of the Stockmann family.

Reception
Scottish drama critic William Archer, an early and contemporary advocate of Ibsen's plays, said the play was less sensational than some of Ibsen's earlier efforts, but was a strong drama with excellent dialogue and characters.

Adaptations
This classic play was adapted by Arthur Miller in the 1950s in a production that opened at the Broadhurst Theater on December 28, 1950. It starred Academy Award winner Fredric March and his wife Florence Eldridge as well as Morris Carnovsky; future Oscar winner Rod Steiger was a "townsperson." Miller's adaptation was presented on National Educational Television in 1966, in a production starring James Daly. It was also made into a movie of the same name in 1978, starring Steve McQueen. The BBC then cast Robert Urquhart as "Tom Stockman" in their 1980 TV version, adapting the story and the cast names to reflect it now being set in a Scottish town.  In the creation of his adaptation of Ibsen's work, several changes were made by Miller to make the play more accessible and accepting to a 1950s audience, as opposed to Ibsen's late 1800s audience. Many major edits not only included the transformation of speech and language, but changes were made to the character of Dr. Stockmann to avoid having him champion eugenics. Throughout the play, Dr. Stockmann acts as a Christ figure. Miller found it necessary therefore to change Ibsen's use of genetic and racial theories from the late 1800s to further Dr. Stockmann's standing as a champion of the lower classes as opposed to a scientist with a belief in racial determinism and the importance of eugenics for "improving" people. For example, in Ibsen's original, a portion of Dr. Stockmann's speech to the people contained:

In Miller's adaptation, no such eugenics-positive screed is read. Miller keeps Dr. Stockmann's ideals as a character, and his dedication to facing down the hypocrisy of the aristocracy and governmental bureaucrats, but portrays him as more of a democratic thinker and socialist, while retaining some of the original character's ideas about the evolution of animals and humans, and the need to cultivate humane qualities in order to bring the masses to a more rational and educated level, so that they can fully participate in a democracy. In Miller's adaptation, part of the doctor's speech reads:

A version was produced for Australian television in 1958.

The 1972 Greek film  O ehthros tou laou (An Enemy of the Society) is an adaptation of the play, taking place in Greece during the mid-1930s.

The play was the indirect inspiration for the blockbuster movie Jaws.

Satyajit Ray's 1989 film Ganashatru was based on this play. In 1990, PBS produced the play for their show American Playhouse, starring William Anton and John Glover.

In 2000 an adaptation of the play called "Paragon Springs" written by Steven Dietz premiered at Milwaukee Repertory theatre in Milwaukee Wisconsin, U.S.A. The play is set in "a small town in the American Midwest" in 1926.

An Enemy of the People (with the subtitle The strongest one is the one who stands alone), a Norwegian film released in 2004 and directed by Erik Skjoldbjærg, is an adaptation of Ibsen's play.

In 2007 Ouriel Zohar's troupe Compagnie Ouriel Zohar performed an adaptation for two actors only of An Enemy of the People, performed first in Paris, then Fréjus, Besançon (2008), Liège, Minsk, Valleyfield (Canada, 2009), and Porto Heli (Greece, 2010).

In early 2013, a stage adaptation entitled "عدو الشعب" (Arabic: Enemy of the people or A Public Enemy) was organized and directed by Nora Amin (who played Doctor Stockmann's wife, with Tarek El-Dewiri as Doctor Stockmann) in Cairo. It was translated into colloquial Arabic and featured a rock-themed soundtrack played live on-set. Jointly sponsored by the Norwegian Embassy in Cairo and the Ibsen Studies Center in Norway, it received various positive reviews at a time when Egypt was plunged into deep political turmoil.

A new adaptation by Robert Falls, based on a 19th-century translation by Eleanor Marx, was staged at Chicago's Goodman Theatre from March - April 2018.

In Autumn 2021, a new National Theatre of Scotland adaptation entitled simply "Enemy", authored by Keiran Hurley and directed by Finn den Hertog, toured Scotland. The play is set in a fictional Scottish town, is written using contemporary language and makes use of innovative technical effects such as overhead projected Twitter feeds, social media comments, and video live streams. https://www.nationaltheatrescotland.com/events/the-enemy

Censored in Mainland China
"An Enemy of the People", produced by Berlin's Schaubühne theater, was performed in Beijing from September 6 to September 8, 2018, but the subsequent touring of the show was cancelled due to its themes. The audience in Beijing reportedly showed overwhelming support for Dr. Stockmann, and allegedly shouted criticism of the Chinese regime during interaction parts. Even in subsequent censored performances, audiences yelled "for personal freedom!" The regime's censorship officers would not agree to any more touring unless the script was doctored in favor of the regime's thought on what a play should be.

Notes

External links

 An Enemy of the People at Project Gutenberg
 
 An Enemy of the People: Study Guide
 Spark Notes 
 
 

Plays by Henrik Ibsen
1882 plays
Norwegian plays adapted into films